The Islamist Bloc, formally the Alliance for Egypt was an electoral alliance of Egyptian political parties, formed for the 2011–12 Egyptian parliamentary election. It consisted of two Salafist parties, Al-Nour and Authenticity Party, as well as the Building and Development Party, which is the political wing of the Islamic Group (al-Gama'a al-Islamiyya). The alliance was publicly announced on 3 November 2011.

Formerly affiliated parties 
 Al-Nour Party
 Authenticity Party 
 Building and Development Party

Results of the 2011 Parliamentary elections

In the 2011/2012 parliamentary elections, the Islamist Block won 7,534,266 votes out of 27,065,135 correct votes, or roughly 27.8% of all votes. The Alliance thus received 96 seats out of 332 in the Egyptian Parliament. The 96 seats were divided between members of the Alliance as follows:
 Al-Nour Party: 83 seats
 Building and Development Party: 10 seats
 Authenticity Party: 3 seats

In addition, independent candidates of the Al-Nour Party won 28 seats out of the 168 seats allocated for independent candidates.

Additionally, three members of the Building and Development Party have been elected as independents.

Thus, the Islamist Bloc won a total of 127 seats out of 498 (25.5%) in the 2012 Egyptian Parliament, thus becoming the second largest political bloc in the parliament after the Democratic Alliance for Egypt.

References

Defunct political party alliances in Egypt
Salafi Islamist groups
Organizations established in 2011